Travis Leffew (born January 27, 1983 in Danville, Kentucky) is a former American football offensive lineman. He was signed by the Chicago Bears as an undrafted free agent in 2006. He played college football at Louisville.

Leffew has also been a member of the Green Bay Packers, Dallas Cowboys, Atlanta Falcons, Kansas City Chiefs and Cleveland Browns.

Travis Leffew is currently the assistant head coach of Kentucky 4A Power Boyle County at which he formerly played. He coaches with his brother Nick Leffew Mills.

College career

Awards and honors
 3 KHSAA State Championships
 Second-team All-Conference USA (2003)
 First-team All-Conference USA (2004)
 Third-team All-American (2004)
 Academic All-Big East (2005)
 All-Big East (2005)
 Second-team All-American (2005)

External links
Cleveland Browns bio
Louisville Cardinals bio

1983 births
Living people
People from Danville, Kentucky
American football offensive tackles
American football offensive guards
Louisville Cardinals football players
Chicago Bears players
Green Bay Packers players
Dallas Cowboys players
Atlanta Falcons players
Kansas City Chiefs players
Cleveland Browns players